Azua Dominica Airport is an airport  south of the city of Azua in the Azua Province of the Dominican Republic. It is an old airport that is used only for the emergency landing of domestic flights. This airport has never had regularly scheduled flights, although some airlines have operated charter or tourist flights here.

See also

Transport in Dominican Republic
List of airports in Dominican Republic

References

External links 
OpenStreetMap - Azua Dominica Airport
OurAirports - Azua Airport

Airports in the Dominican Republic
Buildings and structures in Azua Province